The 1933–34 Magyar Kupa (English: Hungarian Cup) was the 16th season of Hungary's annual knock-out cup football competition.

Final

First replay

Second replay

See also
 1933–34 Nemzeti Bajnokság I

References

External links
 Official site 
 soccerway.com

1933–34 in Hungarian football
1933–34 domestic association football cups
1933-34